Showtime Networks Inc. is an American entertainment company that oversees the company's premium cable television channels, including its flagship service Showtime. It is a subsidiary of media conglomerate Paramount Global under its networks unit.

Overview 
The company was established in 1983 as Showtime/The Movie Channel, Inc. after Viacom and Warner-Amex Satellite Entertainment (now Paramount Media Networks) merged their premium channels, Showtime and The Movie Channel respectively, into one division. In 1984, American Express sold their interest in Warner-Amex to Warner Communications (now Warner Bros. Discovery) making Warner the new half-owner of Showtime/TMC. In 1985, Warner sold its half-interest to Viacom, making the company a wholly owned subsidiary of Viacom. 1985 also saw the pay-per-view service Viewer's Choice become part of the operation; it merged with rival PPV service Home Premiere Television in 1988, and Viacom ceded control to the cable companies that owned HPT (Viacom still held a stake until the 1990s). In 1988, the company was renamed Showtime Networks Inc.

On March 1, 1994, a partnership between Showtime Networks and Home Box Office, Inc. (parent of HBO and Cinemax) implemented a cooperative content advisory system that was initially unveiled across Showtime, The Movie Channel and the HBO properties that would provide specific content information for pay-cable subscribers to determine the suitability of a program for children. The development of the system—inspired by the advisory ratings featured in Showtime and The Movie Channel's respective program guides and those distributed by other participating premium cable services—was in response to concerns from parents and advocacy groups about violent content on television, allowing the Showtime Networks and other services to assign individual ratings corresponding to the objectionable content depicted in specific programs (and categorized based on violence, profanity, sexuality or miscellaneous mature material). Labels are assigned to each program at the discretion of the participating service. A revised system—centered around ten content codes of two to three letters in length—was implemented across the Showtime Networks and Home Box Office services on June 10, 1994.

SNI, along with CBS, UPN, Viacom Outdoor, Spelling Television, CBS Television Studios (formerly CBS Productions, Paramount Television and CBS Paramount Television), CBS Television Distribution (formerly Paramount Domestic Television, CBS Paramount Domestic Television and KingWorld), CBS Studios International (formerly CBS Paramount International Television), Simon & Schuster and other entities became part of CBS Corporation when it officially split from Viacom on December 31, 2005. SNI managed Robert Redford and NBC Universal joint venture Sundance Channel until 2008, when it was sold to Rainbow Media (now AMC Networks), but it eventually re-merged with Viacom to transform into the new ViacomCBS in early December 2019, and later renamed Paramount in 2022.

Cable networks currently owned by SNI 
Year in parentheses denotes when each network and channel was brought into the SNI fold.

 Showtime (1983)+
 SHO2 (formerly SHOTOO) (1994)
 Showcase (formerly Showtime 3) (1996)
 Showtime Extreme (1998)
 SHO×BET (2020)*
 Showtime Next (2001)
 Showtime Family Zone (2001)
 Showtime Women (2001)
 The Movie Channel (1983)+
 The Movie Channel Xtra (1999)
 Flix (1992)

+Channel launched under Warner-Amex Satellite Entertainment prior to 1983.
*Channel originally named Showtime Beyond from 1998 to 2020.

SNI won a Peabody Award in 2002 for Bang Bang You're Dead. In 2008, SNI was honored at the 59th Annual Technology & Engineering Emmy Awards for Outstanding Achievement in Advanced Media Technology for Best Use of Commercial Advertising on Personal Computer for the companion website to the series The L Word.

References

External links 
 

 
Cable network groups in the United States
Paramount Media Networks
1983 establishments in New York City
American companies established in 1983
Companies based in Manhattan
Television broadcasting companies of the United States
Entertainment companies based in New York City
Entertainment companies established in 1983
Entertainment companies of the United States
Mass media companies established in 1983
Mass media companies of the United States
Mass media companies based in New York City
1985 mergers and acquisitions
Multinational companies headquartered in the United States